Iacri is a municipality in the state of São Paulo in Brazil. The population is 6,295 (2020 est.) in an area of 322 km². The elevation is 499 m.

References

External links
  Official page of Prefeitura de Iacri

Municipalities in São Paulo (state)